Mahaprasad may refer to:
 Mahaprasad (Jagannath Temple)
 Mahaprasad: Used for Goat Meat produced via Jhatka among Nihangs.

See also
Mahaprasada